The Authenticity and Development Front (Jabhat al-'asalah wa'l-tanmiyah) is an alliance of rebel groups that is active during the Syrian Civil War. The alliance is considered to be moderate by Charles Lister (from Middle East Institute) and the BBC.

Background
The coalition includes Islamists, military defectors, and former civilians. Although the alliance uses Syrian independence flags and symbols, it does not identify itself as part of the Free Syrian Army. One of the groups involved was the Nour al-Din al-Zenki Movement, which was also part of the Army of Mujahideen, though the Army of Mujahideen announced on 4 May 2014 that the Nour al-Din al-Zenki Movement had withdrawn from the coalition. The Authenticity and Development Front operated American-made BGM-71 TOW anti-tank missiles captured from the Islamic State of Iraq and the Levant.

Member Groups

Current
The White Shroud
Army of Tawhid
Tajamuu Alwiyat al-Iman Billah
Liwa Hamah al-Aqidah 
Tajamuu Jund al-Badr Brigade 313
Lions of Islam Brigade
Talbisah Brigade 
Falcons of Talbisah Brigade
Muawiyah Ibn Abi Sufyan Brigade
Sword of Islam Battalion
Tajamuu Alwiyat wa Kataib Suyuf al-Haq
Battalions of the People of Impact
Abd Al-Rahman Battalions
Miqdad Bin al-Aswad Battalion
Division 60
Jund al-Sham

Former Groups
Lions of the East Army
Liwa Basha’ir al-Nasr
Nour al-Din al-Zenki Movement 
Liwa al-Fatah al-Mubin (Formerly part of the Allahu Akbar Battalions)
Ibn Taymiyyah Mujahideen Brigades (Joined Ahrar al-Sham)
New Syrian Army (Expelled from Authenticity and Development Front, continued operations as independent group)
Allahu Akbar Battalions

See also
List of armed groups in the Syrian Civil War

References

External links
 Authenticity and Development Front official Twitter page

Anti-government factions of the Syrian civil war
Anti-ISIL factions in Syria
Military units and factions of the Syrian civil war
Military units and formations established in 2012